Henri Leclerc was a French racing cyclist. He finished in last place in the 1914 Tour de France.

References

External links
 

Year of birth missing
Year of death missing
French male cyclists
Cyclists from Paris